North Albert Peak is a  mountain summit located in British Columbia, Canada.

Description

The nearest higher neighbor is Albert Peak,  to the immediate southeast. Precipitation runoff from the mountain drains into tributaries of the nearby Illecillewaet River. North Albert Peak is more notable for its steep rise above local terrain than for its absolute elevation. The peak is visible from Highway 1 (the Trans-Canada Highway) between Revelstoke and Rogers Pass.

History

The first ascent of the summit was made in 1909 by W. A. Alldritt and G. L. Haggen.
 
The landform was named after Albert Luther Rogers (1859–1929), the nephew of Major A. B. Rogers, and his assistant while exploring this area 1881–82 for a Canadian Pacific Railway route through the Selkirk and Rocky Mountains. Albert Rogers was born June 19, 1859, in Waterville, Minnesota, and died May 16, 1929, in Waterville, Washington. He was a civil engineer, civic leader and merchant in Waterville, as well as regent for the University of Washington (1909–1913). The mountain's toponym was officially adopted September 8, 1932, by the Geographical Names Board of Canada.

Climate

Based on the Köppen climate classification, North Albert Peak is located in a subarctic climate zone with cold, snowy winters, and mild summers. Winter temperatures can drop below −20 °C with wind chill factors below −30 °C.

See also
 
Geography of British Columbia

References

External links
 North Albert Peak: Weather forecast
 North Albert and Albert Peaks (photo): Flickr

Two-thousanders of British Columbia
Selkirk Mountains
Columbia Country
Kootenay Land District